KWTX (1230 kHz) is an AM radio station broadcasting a news/talk radio format. Licensed to Waco, Texas, the station is owned by iHeartMedia, Inc.  Its studios are located on Highway 6 in Waco, and its transmitter is also located in Waco, south of Baylor University.

Programming
KWTX's programming, for the most part, follows the iHeartMedia standard talk radio lineup.  Weekday syndicated programming includes Glenn Beck, The Clay Travis and Buck Sexton Show, Sean Hannity, Coast to Coast AM with George Noory and This Morning, America's First News with Gordon Deal.  Two other weekday syndicated shows come from other iHeart stations in Texas, Michael Berry from KTRH in Houston and Joe Pags from WOAI in San Antonio.  Weekend programming includes At Home with Gary Sullivan,  The Kim Komando Show, Handel on the Law, The Jesus Christ Show and Live on Sunday Nights, It's Bill Cunningham.

KWTX no longer features a local morning show, instead airing Gordon Deal.  Past morning hosts include; Mac Watson, Garret Lewis and Shane Warner.

History
KWTX first signed on the air on May 1, 1946.  It was the second radio station in Waco, and originally broadcast with 250 watts.  KWTX was a network affiliate of the Mutual Broadcasting System.

In 1955, it added Channel 10 KWTX-TV.  And in 1970, it signed on an FM radio station, KWTX-FM 97.5 MHz.

References

External links

WTX
News and talk radio stations in the United States
Radio stations established in 1946
1946 establishments in Texas
IHeartMedia radio stations